Sosnovoborsk is the name of several urban localities in Russia:
Sosnovoborsk, Krasnoyarsk Krai, a town in Krasnoyarsk Krai; administratively incorporated as a krai city
Sosnovoborsk, Penza Oblast, a work settlement in Sosnovoborsky District of Penza Oblast